Illabo (pron. ILL a boh) is a locality in the South West Slopes part of the Riverina in New South Wales, Australia. At the 2016 census, Illabo had a population of 144.

History 
Illabo Post Office opened on 1 July 1879. A railway station on the Main South railway served the town between 1878 and the 1970s. A grain silo remains in use. The town name is said to derive from an Aboriginal word meaning "where", but other sources derive it as a clipping of billabong.

Noted residents
George Main, a chairman of the Australian Jockey Club, and his wife Mary had a grazing property "Retreat", at Illabo, where they bred racehorses and ran sheep. The George Main Stakes was named for him.
Their daughter Jean Main married Clive Caldwell in 1940 and lived in Illabo for several years after becoming one of Australia's leading fighter aces of WWII and as "Killer Caldwell" a household name throughout Australia.
Hugh Main, George's brother, also a horse breeder but much better known as the local MLA 1920–1938, had an adjacent property, part of "Retreat", and has been referred to as "Retreat East", and may have been at least in part, in the Bethungra district.

Notes and references

External links

Community website

Towns in the Riverina
Junee Shire
Main Southern railway line, New South Wales